Naolan is an extinct language that was spoken a five-hour walk away from Tula, Tamaulipas in northeast Mexico. It is only known from 48 words and several phrases collected in the 1940s, and was nearly extinct at that time (Weitlaner 1948).

Classification
Naolán has been compared to numerous languages, but none are obviously close and there is not enough data to spot more distant relationships. Six of the words are Spanish loans, five more appear to be loans from neighboring languages, and another four are suspected loans, leaving little to work with. Campbell (1979, 1997) therefore considers it unclassified.

Vocabulary
Weitlaner's (1948) word list of Naolan is reproduced below. The words had been collected from multiple informants, who were Román Rochas, Procopio Medrano Silva, Febronio Saenz, María Hernández, and Mariano Saenz.

Phrases
Naolan phrases from Weitlaner (1948):

References 

Unclassified languages of North America
Indigenous languages of Mexico
Languages extinct in the 1950s
Extinct languages of North America